Hobie Noble is Child ballad 189 and a border ballad.

Synopsis

Hobie Noble, an Englishman, was outlawed and fled to Scotland.  A traitor tried persuade him to come to England.  The traitor failed, but learned where Hobie was going, and sent word.  Hobie dreamed that he was attacked and woke.  He and his men tried to escape, but his attackers found and defeated them.  Hobie was taken prisoner and carried off, to many comments that he had freed Jock o the Side.  He refused to confess to any crimes, and said he would rather be a prisoner than a traitor.

External links
Hobie Noble

Child Ballads
Border ballads
Northumbrian folklore
English outlaws
Songwriter unknown
Year of song unknown